Omega is the eleventh studio album by British rock band Asia, released on 21 April 2010 in Japan by Melodious Frontier and on 23 April 2010 in Europe by Frontiers Records. It was the fourth studio recording with the original line-up and second after the reunion in 2006.

Production 
Omega was recorded from October 2009 to February 2010 at Steve Rispin's Liscombe Park Studios, Buckinghamshire, where Asia had already worked on their previous album, Phoenix (2008). For the first time since the debut album, released in 1982, the group employed an outside producer, Mike Paxman. The cover artwork was designed by Roger Dean, who had collaborated with Asia since their inception and with Yes, of which guitarist Steve Howe and keyboard player Geoff Downes had previously been members. The white tiger on the front cover indicates that 2010 is the Year of the Tiger in the Chinese calendar.

"Finger on the Trigger" was previously recorded by vocalist/bassist John Wetton and Downes for their collaboration studio album Icon II: Rubicon (2006).

Reception 
Bret Adams gave Omega a rating of three-and-a-half stars out of five on AllMusic. "Finger on the Trigger", "Holy War", "Light the Way" and "I Believe" were selected as four "Track Picks". He compared the album with the previous one and summarized that "Phoenix has better songs overall than Omega — probably due to the initial excitement and creative surge spawned by the reunion — but Omega satisfies, and longtime fans will enjoy it".

The album did not sell well, failing to chart in both United Kingdom and United States, but reached number 29 in Japan, where Asia were always a popular foreign act.

Track listing

Personnel

Asia 
 John Wetton – vocals, bass guitar
 Steve Howe – electric, acoustic and steel guitars
 Geoff Downes – keyboards
 Carl Palmer – drums, percussion

Technical personnel 
 Mike Paxman – producer
 Steve Rispin – engineer
 Mark "Tufty" Evans – mixing engineer (at Wispington Studios, Cookham, Berkshire)
 Secondwave − mastering
 Roger Dean – cover, logotype, inside painting
 Martyn Dean – computer work, cover design
 Michael Inns – photography
 Karen Gladwell – artwork

Charts

References 

Asia (band) albums
2010 albums
Frontiers Records albums
Albums produced by Mike Paxman
Albums with cover art by Roger Dean (artist)